The 1977 Arab Athletics Championships was the inaugural edition of the international athletics competition between Arab countries. It took place in Damascus, Syria, coming one year after the city had hosted the 1976 Pan Arab Games. The absence of Egypt, Algeria and Morocco—the three foremost Arab nations in the sport—meant the level of competition was lower than that seen at the games. Iraq was the dominant nation, winning half the gold medals, and Tunisia was a clear second place with five golds. The hosts, Syria, placed third with a medal haul of twelve. Eight of the twelve participating nations reached the medal table.

A total of 22 athletics events were contested, all by men. The schedule mirrored that of the recent Pan Arab Games, with the exception of the hammer throw and decathlon, which were not held here. Women athletes were not included at the competition until the following edition in 1979.

Iraq's Falah Naji Jarallah was the most successful athlete of the games, having taken a middle-distance running double in the 800 metres and 1500 metres. He was the only athlete to win two individual titles in Damascus. Iraq athletes won all the track events bar the long-distance races, where Tunisia's Mansour Guettaya and Abdelkader Zaddem were dominant, and the steeplechase (won by Syria's Samir Mustapha). Four Arab champions also won an individual silver as well: Guettaya (1500 m and 5000 m), Abbas Al-Aibi (400 m and 800 m), Heitham Nadim (100 m and 200 m) and Hussein Dawood (horizontal jumps).

The establishment of the competition brought an increase in regional competition, particularly for African Arab nations as the African Championships in Athletics was not established until two years later. For such nations, the Maghreb Athletics Championships, first held in 1967, served as a partial precursor to the broader Arab Championships.

Medal summary

Medal table

References

Results
 Al Batal Al Arabi (N°:1). Arab Athletics Union. Retrieved on 2015-02-14.

Arab Athletics Championships
International athletics competitions hosted by Syria
Sport in Damascus
Arab Athletics Championships
Arab Athletics Championships
20th century in Damascus